Leucopogon bracteolaris is a species of flowering plant in the heath family Ericaceae and is endemic to the south-west of Western Australia. The leaves sometimes have a stem-clasping base, and are covered with fine hairs. The flowers are arranged in large, cylindrical spikes on the ends of branches with leaf-like, lance-shaped bracts and bracteoles almost as long as the sepals.

It was first formally described in 1868 by George Bentham in Flora Australiensis. The specific epithet (bracteolaris) means "having bracteoles". 

This leucopogon occurs in the Esperance plains and Jarrah Forest bioregions of the south-west of Western Australia and is listed as "Priority Two" by the Western Australian Government Department of Biodiversity, Conservation and Attractions, meaning that it is poorly known and from only one or a few locations.

References

blepharolepis
Ericales of Australia
Flora of Western Australia
Plants described in 1868
Taxa named by George Bentham